The 1939–40 Iowa State Cyclones men's basketball team represented Iowa State University during the 1939-40 NCAA College men's basketball season. The Cyclones were coached by Louis Menze, who was in his twelfth season with the Cyclones. They played their home games at the State Gymnasium in Ames, Iowa.

They finished the season 9–9, 2–8 in Big Six play to finish in a tie for fourth place.

Roster

Schedule and results 

|-
!colspan=6 style=""|Regular Season

|-

References 

Iowa State Cyclones men's basketball seasons
Iowa State
Iowa State Cyc
Iowa State Cyc